G. P. Rajarathnam (1909–1979), known by his pen name as Bhramara (meaning:Bee), was a Kannada author, lyricist and poet in Karnataka, India. Rajarathnam was well known for composing poems for children. Nissar Ahmed, once quoted as "he understood the minds of children, and their need. Some of his works have remained a challenge for translators even today".

Rajarathnam wrote on Buddhism, Jainism and Islam. A road has been named after him in Bengaluru, of the state.

Personal life 
Rajarathnam was born in 1909, in Gundlupet, Chamrajnagar, Karnataka. His ancestors belonged to Tirukkanapur agrahara of Tamil Nadu's Naga city. They migrated to Mysore, Karnataka in 1906. Rajarathnam's wives were Lalithamma and Seethamma.

Career 
Rajarathnam wrote 230 works in 338 publications including books such as Rathnana Padagalu (Meaning: Ratna's words) and Nagana Padagalu (Meaning: Naga's words), and children's poems such as Nayi Mari Nayi Mari (Meaning: Puppy dog, puppy dog), Bannadha Thagadina Thuthoori (Meaning: Colorful metalfoil trumpet) and Ondhu-Yeardu (Meaning: One-Two).  His works were known to be a confluence of all religions. He was the teacher of Kannada poet Dr.Shivarudrappa.

Bibliography

Filmography

 Olave Mandara  (lyricist) (2011)
 Kallara Santhe  (lyricist) (2009)
 Suntaragaali  (lyricist) (2006)
 Gokarna  (lyricist) (2003)
 A  (lyricist) (1998)
 Chitrakoota  (lyricist) (1980)
 Mother  (lyricist) (1980)
 Havina Hede  (lyricist) (1981)
 Devadasi  (lyricist) (1978)
 Anireekshitha  (lyricist) (1970)

Popular songs 
 "Helkolokondoru"

References

Citations 

1909 births
1979 deaths
Indian children's writers
Kannada-language writers
Poets from Karnataka
20th-century Indian poets
Kannada poets
People from Chamarajanagar
Kannada people
Indian socialists